Juan Castillo (born 10 September 1952 in La Paz, Canelones) is a Uruguayan trade unionist and politician. He has served as Secretary General of the Communist Party of Uruguay since 18 June 2017.

In 2016, Castillo was named president of the Rampla Juniors football club. Castillo was soon replaced with Isabel Pena.

References

1952 births
Living people
People from Canelones Department
Uruguayan people of Spanish descent
Communist Party of Uruguay politicians
Broad Front (Uruguay) politicians
Uruguayan trade unionists